The Ambassador Extraordinary and Plenipotentiary of the Russian Federation to the Republic of Vanuatu is the official representative of the President and the Government of the Russian Federation to the Prime Minister and the Government of Vanuatu.

The Russian ambassador to Vanuatu is a non-resident ambassador, who holds the post of ambassador to Australia, where he and his staff work at large in the Embassy of Russia in Canberra. The ambassador holds dual accreditation to Australia, Fiji, Nauru, Tuvalu and Vanuatu.

History of diplomatic relations

The formal establishment of diplomatic relations between the Soviet Union and Vanuatu took place on 30 June 1986. The incumbent Soviet ambassador to Australia, Yevgeny Samoteykin, was appointed to serve concurrently as ambassador to Vanuatu on 3 September 1986. With the dissolution of the Soviet Union in 1991 the incumbent ambassador, Vyacheslav Dolgov, continued as representative of the Russian Federation until 1993.

List of representatives (1986 – present)

Representatives of the Soviet Union to Vanuatu (1986 – 1991)

Representatives of the Russian Federation to Vanuatu (1991 – present)

References

 
Vanuatu
Russia